In computing, sendfile is a command which can be found in a number of contexts relating to data transmission:

Sendfile (Unix), a push-based asynchronous file transfer, regardless of whether local or remote, using the Simple Asynchronous File Transfer (SAFT), an Internet protocol bound to TCP port 487
Sendfile (IBM VM), a command to transfer a file asynchronously from one VM/CMS user to another, regardless of whether local or remote
Sendfile (system call), a system call.
As a command within an Instant messaging application.

Notes 

Data synchronization